Martín Bernardo Lasarte Arróspide (born 20 March 1961) is a Uruguayan former footballer who played as a defender, most recently the manager of the Chile national team.

He represented five teams in his country, and also had a three-and-a-half-year spell in Spain with Deportivo during a 16-year senior career.

Lasarte began working as a coach in 1996, and managed several clubs over the next decades including Nacional where he also had played.

Playing career
Lasarte was born in Montevideo to a Spanish father and an Uruguayan mother, with the former having immigrated from the Basque Country. In his country, he represented C.A. Rentistas (two spells), Central Español, Rampla Juniors (twice), Club Nacional de Football and Defensor Sporting, winning four major titles with the fourth club including the 1988 edition of the Copa Libertadores followed by the Intercontinental Cup.

Abroad, Lasarte played four seasons for Deportivo de La Coruña in Spain. In 1990–91 he helped the Galicians return to La Liga, appearing in 35 complete matches the following campaign as the side finally avoided relegation. He also acted as captain in several games.

Coaching career
Lasarte's career as manager began at the age of 35 with Rampla Juniors, which he led to the second position in the Primera División in the 1996 Clausura. In the following years he was in charge of several clubs, including Al Wasl F.C. from the United Arab Emirates in 2002, which he joined with the side in last place, eventually leading them to fifth.

In 2003, Lasarte was appointed at Club Atlético River Plate (Montevideo), helping to promotion from the Segunda División in his second season. He led his following team, Nacional de Montevideo, to two consecutive national championships. After finishing fifth in the 2006–07 Apertura he did not have his contract renewed and left, going on to have a very brief spell in Colombia.

After one season with Danubio F.C. in his country, Lasarte returned to the land of his father and signed for Real Sociedad in the Segunda División. In his first season they returned to the top flight after an absence of three years and, in late August 2010, he extended his contract until June 2012.

In 2010–11, Real were close to the qualifying positions to the UEFA Europa League late into the first half of the campaign, but eventually had to wait until the last matchday to be safe from relegation, which eventually happened. On 24 May 2011, however, he was relieved of his duties.

On 15 May 2014, Lasarte was named manager of Club Universidad de Chile. In June 2016, in the same capacity, he returned to Nacional.

Lasarte was appointed at Egyptian Premier League's Al Ahly SC in December 2018. He led the club to its 41st national championship in his first season but, on 18 August 2019, was dismissed after being ousted from the Egypt Cup by Pyramids FC.

On 10 February 2021, the Football Federation of Chile announced Lasarte as their national team's new coach. On April 1, 2022, Martin Lasarte decided not to continue with the Chile national team.

Managerial statistics

Honours

Player
Nacional
Copa Libertadores: 1988
Intercontinental Cup: 1988

Manager
River Plate Montevideo
Uruguayan Segunda División: 2004

Nacional
Uruguayan Primera División: 2005, 2005–06, 2016

Real Sociedad
Segunda División: 2009–10

Universidad de Chile
Chilean Primera División: 2014 Apertura
Copa Chile: 2015
Supercopa de Chile: 2015

Al Ahly
Egyptian Premier League: 2018–19

References

External links

1961 births
Living people
Uruguayan people of Basque descent
Footballers from Montevideo
Uruguayan footballers
Association football defenders
Uruguayan Primera División players
C.A. Rentistas players
Central Español players
Rampla Juniors players
Club Nacional de Football players
Defensor Sporting players
La Liga players
Segunda División players
Deportivo de La Coruña players
Uruguayan expatriate footballers
Expatriate footballers in Spain
Uruguayan expatriate sportspeople in Spain
Uruguayan football managers
Uruguayan Primera División managers
Rampla Juniors managers
C.A. Rentistas managers
C.A. Bella Vista managers
River Plate Montevideo managers
Club Nacional de Football managers
Danubio F.C. managers
Millonarios F.C. managers
La Liga managers
Segunda División managers
Real Sociedad managers
Chilean Primera División managers
Club Deportivo Universidad Católica managers
Universidad de Chile managers
Egyptian Premier League managers
Al Ahly SC managers
Chile national football team managers
2021 Copa América managers
Uruguayan expatriate football managers
Expatriate football managers in the United Arab Emirates
Expatriate football managers in Colombia
Expatriate football managers in Spain
Expatriate football managers in Chile
Expatriate football managers in Egypt
Uruguayan expatriate sportspeople in the United Arab Emirates
Uruguayan expatriate sportspeople in Colombia
Uruguayan expatriate sportspeople in Chile
Uruguayan expatriate sportspeople in Egypt